A mechanism is called incentive-compatible (IC) if every participant can achieve the best outcome to themselves just by acting according to their true preferences.

There are several different degrees of incentive-compatibility: 

 The stronger degree is dominant-strategy incentive-compatibility (DSIC). It means that truth-telling is a weakly-dominant strategy, i.e. you fare best or at least not worse by being truthful, regardless of what the others do. In a DSIC mechanism, strategic considerations cannot help any agent achieve better outcomes than the truth; hence, such mechanisms are also called strategyproof or truthful. (See Strategyproofness)
 A weaker degree is Bayesian-Nash incentive-compatibility (BNIC). It means that there is a Bayesian Nash equilibrium in which all participants reveal their true preferences. I.e, if all the others act truthfully, then it is also best or at least not worse for you to be truthful.

Every DSIC mechanism is also BNIC, but a BNIC mechanism may exist even if no DSIC mechanism exists.

Typical examples of DSIC mechanisms are majority voting between two alternatives, and second-price auction.

Typical examples of a mechanisms that are not DSIC are plurality voting between three or more alternatives and first-price auction.

In randomized mechanisms 
A randomized mechanism is a probability-distribution on deterministic mechanisms. There are two ways to define incentive-compatibility of randomized mechanisms:
 The stronger definition is: a randomized mechanism is universally-incentive-compatible if every mechanism selected with positive probability is incentive-compatible (e.g. if truth-telling gives the agent an optimal value regardless of the coin-tosses of the mechanism).
 The weaker definition is: a randomized mechanism is incentive-compatible-in-expectation if the game induced by expectation is incentive-compatible (e.g. if truth-telling gives the agent an optimal expected value).

Revelation principles 

The revelation principle comes in two variants corresponding to the two flavors of incentive-compatibility:
 The dominant-strategy revelation-principle says that every social-choice function that can be implemented in dominant-strategies can be implemented by a DSIC mechanism.
 The Bayesian–Nash revelation-principle says that every social-choice function that can be implemented in Bayesian–Nash equilibrium (Bayesian game, i.e. game of incomplete information) can be implemented by a BNIC mechanism.

See also
 Implementability (mechanism design)
 Lindahl tax
 Monotonicity (mechanism design)
 Preference revelation
 Strategyproofness

References

Mechanism design
Game theory